Jarmila Müllerová (later Suková, 24 February 1901 – 24 April 1944) was a Czech backstroke swimmer who competed for Czechoslovakia in the 1924 Summer Olympics. She was born in České Budějovice and died in Prague. In 1924 she finished fifth in the 100 metre backstroke event.

References

External links
 profile

1901 births
1944 deaths
Czech female swimmers
Czechoslovak female swimmers
Olympic swimmers of Czechoslovakia
Swimmers at the 1924 Summer Olympics
Sportspeople from České Budějovice